The 1969–70 Southern Football League season was the 67th in the history of the league, an English football competition.

Cambridge United won the championship, winning their second Southern League title in a row and were elected to the Football League, whilst Ashford Town (Kent), Bedford Town, Cambridge City, Dartford were all promoted to the Premier Division.

Premier Division
The Premier Division consisted of 22 clubs, including 18 clubs from the previous season and four new clubs, promoted from Division One:
Bath City
Brentwood Town
Crawley Town
Gloucester City

Also, at the end of the previous season Wellington Town were renamed Telford United.

Cambridge United was elected to the Football League in place of Bradford Park Avenue. At the end of the season Brentwood Town resigned from the league after three seasons and folded. Thus, Gloucester City and Nuneaton Borough remained in the division.

League table

Division One
Division One consisted of 22 clubs, including 18 clubs from the previous season and four new clubs, relegated from the Premier Division:
Bedford Town
Cheltenham Town
Guildford City
Rugby Town

At the end of the season Wisbech Town resigned from the league and switched to the Eastern Counties Football League.

League table

Football League elections
Alongside the four League clubs facing re-election, a total of 13 non-League clubs applied for election, ten of which were Southern League clubs. Three League clubs were re-elected, and Cambridge United were elected.

See also
 Southern Football League
 1969–70 Northern Premier League

References
RSSF – Southern Football League archive

Southern Football League seasons
S